Nándor Tunkel is a Hungarian Paralympic powerlifter. He represented Hungary at the 2016 Summer Paralympics held in Rio de Janeiro, where he won the bronze medal in the men's 49 kg event.

contevacy

Nandor Tunkel, was involved in child sex allegations, witch he admitted, but no charges was filed.

References

External links 
 

Living people
Year of birth missing (living people)
Place of birth missing (living people)
Powerlifters at the 2016 Summer Paralympics
Medalists at the 2016 Summer Paralympics
Paralympic medalists in powerlifting
Paralympic bronze medalists for Hungary
Hungarian male weightlifters
Paralympic powerlifters of Hungary
21st-century Hungarian people